Tiny Core Linux (TCL) is a minimal Linux kernel based operating system focusing on providing a base system using BusyBox and FLTK. It was developed by Robert Shingledecker, who was previously the lead developer of Damn Small Linux. The distribution is notable for its small size (11 to 16 MB) and minimalism; additional functions are provided by extensions. Tiny Core Linux is free and open-source software licensed under the GNU General Public License version 2.

Types 
 

 

 Tiny Core (16 MB) is the recommended option for new users who have a wired network connection. It includes the base Core system and a dynamic FLTK/FLWM graphical user interface.
 Core (11 MB) (also known as "Micro Core Linux") is a smaller variant of Tiny Core without a graphical desktop, though additional extensions can be added to create a system with a graphical desktop environment.
 dCore (12 MB) is a core made from Debian or Ubuntu compatible files that uses import and the SCE package format, a self-contained package format for the Tiny Core distribution since 5.x series.
 CorePure64 is a notable port of "Core" to the x86_64 architecture.
 Core Plus (106 MB) is "an installation image and not the distribution". It is composed of Tiny Core with additional functionality, most notably wireless support and non-US keyboard support.
 piCore is the Raspberry Pi port of "Core".

System requirements 
Minimal configuration:
Tiny Core needs at least 46 MB of RAM in order to run, and (micro) Core requires at least 28 MB of RAM. The minimum CPU is an i486DX.

Recommended configuration:
A Pentium II CPU and 128 MB of RAM are recommended for Tiny Core.

Design philosophy 
The developers describe TCL as "a nomadic ultra small graphical desktop operating system capable of booting from cdrom, pendrive, or frugally from a hard drive." As of version 2.8.1, the core is designed to run primarily in RAM but with three distinct modes of operation:
 "Cloud" or Internet mode — A "testdrive" mode using a built-in appbrowser GUI to explore extensions from an online application extension repository loaded into RAM only for the current session.
 TCE/Install — A mode for Tiny Core Extensions downloaded and run from a storage partition but kept as symbolic links in RAM.
 TCE/CopyFS — A mode which installs applications onto a Linux partition like a more typical Linux installation.

Release history

See also 

 Comparison of Linux live distributions
 Lightweight Linux distribution
 List of Linux distributions that run from RAM
 Telikin

References

External links 
 
 
 .
 
  Since March 2020 defunct, but the last version is available at archive.org (see also: post in the TinyCore forum).
 
 

Light-weight Linux distributions
Lightweight Unix-like systems
Linux distributions
Linux distributions without systemd
Operating system distributions bootable from read-only media
Independent Linux distributions